Auersperg may refer to:

Principality of Auersperg, estates held by the princely Austrian family of Auersperg
Palais Auersperg, a large baroque palace in Vienna, built for the princely Auersperg family

People with the surname
Herbard VIII von Auersperg (1528–1575), Habsburg general in the wars against the Ottoman Empire
Andreas von Auersperg (1556–1593), the "Carniolan Achilles", a  leader  in the Battle of Sisak in 1593
Johann Weikhard of Auersperg (1615–1677), the first Fürst von Auersperg and Prime Minister of Austria 
Johann Ferdinand of Auersperg (1655–1705), the second Fürst von Auersperg
Franz Karl of Auersperg (1660–1713), the third Fürst von Auersperg
Heinrich Joseph Johann of Auersperg (1697–1783), the fourth Fürst von Auersperg
Joseph Franz Auersperg (1734-1795), Austrian count, prince bishop of Passau, cardinal
Count Anton Alexander von Auersperg (1806–1876), Austrian poet and liberal politician from Carniola
Prince Karl of Auersperg (1814–1890), Austrian statesman and the 8th prince of Auersperg
Prince Adolf of Auersperg (1821–1885), Austrian statesman
Prince Karl Maria Alexander of Auersperg (1859–1927), Austrian landowner and politician

See also
Turjak Castle, a 13th-century castle in Carniola (Slovenia) known in German as Burg Auersperg